The Team fixed large bird event was part of the archery programme at the 1920 Summer Olympics. The event, like all other archery events in 1920, was open only to men. One team of six archers from Belgium competed.

There were two events in the fixed large bird category, though each archer shot only once. The individual scores were used to determine the individual medals and the top three scores for each six-man team were summed to determine team scores.  All six members of each medalist team were considered to be medalists.

Results

References

Sources
 
 

Archery at the 1920 Summer Olympics